Anila (अनिल) is a Hindu deity.

Anila may also refer to:

"Anila" as female given name
 Anila Naz Chowdhury (born 1979), Bangladeshi singer
 Anila Baig (born 1970), British journalist
 Anila Bitri (born 1963), Albanian diplomat
 Anila Dalal (born 1933), Indian critic and translator
 Anila Mirza (born 1974), Danish singer
 Anila, a competitor on Albania's Big Brother season 5

Religion
Anila (頞儞羅), one of the Twelve Heavenly Generals of Buddhism

Other uses
 "Anila", a song from the album Eclipse: A Collection of Rarities & Music for Film
 Anila, an obsolete genus name for the species Indigofera australis

See also
Anilai and Asinai, two Babylonian-Jewish robber chieftains of the Parthian Empire
Anilao, Mabini, Batangas, a section of the municipality of Mabini, Batangas, Philippines
Anilao, Iloilo, a municipality in the Philippines
Anil (disambiguation)